The 1975–76 Washington Huskies men's basketball team represented the University of Washington for the 1975–76 NCAA Division I men's basketball season. Led by fifth-year head coach Marv Harshman, the Huskies were members of the Pacific-8 Conference and played their home games on campus at Hec Edmundson Pavilion in Seattle, Washington.

In their final three games, all on the road, the eighth-ranked Huskies defeated #17  but then lost at Oregon State and Washington State.
 
Washington made the 32-team NCAA Tournament as an at-large team, their first appearance in 23 years. The NCAA announced the selections prior to the end of the regular  two days before the Huskies' loss to the rival Cougars in Pullman. Oregon was seeded into the quarterfinals of the twelve-team NIT, while OSU and WSU stayed home.

The eleventh-ranked Huskies met #10 Missouri in the first round in Lawrence, Kansas, and lost by two points. (Missouri also fell in that poll, four slots to fourteenth.)

The next NCAA tournament appearance for Washington was eight years away.

Postseason result

|-
!colspan=6 style=| NCAA Tournament

References

External links
Sports Reference – Washington Huskies: 1975–76 basketball season

Washington Huskies men's basketball seasons
Washington Huskies
Washington
Washington